is a 2000 art film written and directed by Hideaki Anno. The film is Anno's second live-action feature. The screenplay is an adaption of Ayako Fujitani's novella Tōhimu, which was inspired by an emotionally difficult time in Los Angeles working on her father Steven Seagal's 1998 film The Patriot.

The film tells the story of a director (Shunji Iwai) who meets an odd young woman (Fujitani). Taking place over a period of 33 days, the plot involves these two characters trying to work their way out of a collective emotional funk. Michael Ordona of the Los Angeles Times reported the film had "dark themes of mental illness and suicidal ideation". Shiki-Jitsu won an award for Best Artistic Contribution at the 13th International Film Festival in Tokyo.

Story
The film follows a young Director returning to his home city of Ube in Yamaguchi Prefecture, and an eccentric young Woman he meets, whose quirks include saying "tomorrow is my birthday" every day and wearing very unusual clothing.

But as the days go by, it appears that the Woman has little touch with reality and is constantly escaping into a fantasy world, while the Director himself is a former anime director who is seeking to do a "real film" and embrace reality. The two eventually fall in love.

In the end, the Director confronts the Woman with her mother, allowing the Woman to make the first steps into the real world. The films ends with the Girl circling December 7 as her real birthday and the words "beyond the 33rd day: unknown".

Release
The film was produced by Studio Kajino, an offshoot of Studio Ghibli, run by its former president Toshio Suzuki who served on the film as executive producer. It was given a première at the Tokyo Photography Museum in Ebisu Garden Place on December 7, 2000.

The movie was later released on VHS and DVD by Buena Vista Home Entertainment Japan July 24, 2003 as part of the "Ghibli Cinematic Library" series. On July 1, 2020, the movie was released to Video on demand by King Records.

References

External links

Tokyo Movie Report 26
Shiki-Jitsu page on Hideaki Anno - Life After Evangelion

Japanese drama films
2000 films
Films directed by Hideaki Anno
Films with screenplays by Hideaki Anno
2000s Japanese-language films